Astragalus mohavensis is a species of milkvetch known by the common name Mojave milkvetch. It is native to the Mojave Desert of California and Nevada.

Description

Varieties
There are two varieties of this plant. The rare variety A. m. var. hemigyrus, the halfring milkvetch, can be found only in Nevada, having been extirpated from the California side of the desert; it can be distinguished from the more common variety by its curved or coiled seed pods.

References

External links
Jepson Manual Treatment - Astragalus mohavensis
USDA Plants Profile: Astragalus mohavensis
Astragalus mohavensis - Photo gallery

mohavensis
Flora of the California desert regions
Flora of Nevada
Natural history of the Mojave Desert
Flora without expected TNC conservation status